George Marino (April 15, 1947 – June 4, 2012) was an American mastering engineer known for working on albums by rock bands starting in the late 1960s.

Biography
Marino was born on April 15, 1947, in the New York City borough The Bronx. He attended Christopher Columbus High School there and learned to play the saxophone and bass fiddle in the high school band and was classically trained on guitar. Marino broke into the music business as a guitarist playing rock and roll in local New York City bands such as The Chancellors and The New Sounds Ltd. until most of the band members were drafted into the service for the war in Vietnam.

In 1967, Marino landed his first job in the industry as a librarian and assistant at Capitol Studios. Soon after, he apprenticed in the mastering department alongside of Joe Lansky, cutting rock, pop, jazz and classical albums. There, in 1968, he met his future wife, Rose Gross, whom he married in 1973. Gross became Clive Davis' assistant in 1974, a few months before Davis started Arista Records and she remained Clive Davis' assistant for 26 years.

Professional career
During his time at Capitol, Marino mastered such classics as The Beatles' 7-inch single of "Hey Jude" and John Lennon & Plastic Ono Band's Live Peace in Toronto 1969. When Capitol Records closed its New York studio in 1971, Marino joined the fledgling Record Plant, eventually becoming a partner in the mastering business of the Record Plant called the Master Cutting Room, which was on West 44th Street in Manhattan. There he became established with projects such as Don McLean's American Pie, Alice Cooper's Billion Dollar Babies, Gregg Allman's Laid Back, and Stevie Wonder's Talking Book and Innervisions.

Lee Hulko, one of the owners of Sterling Sound, saw Marino's success and asked him to come work at Sterling, however Marino did not say yes immediately. After Chris Stone, the owner of the Record Plant went to Los Angeles, Marino had more management duties and he felt it distracted him from his mastering work. Eventually, Marino took Hulko up on his offer and he headed to Sterling Sound in 1973 to work in a room that Hulko had built for him.

Sterling Sound
From 1973, until his death in 2012, Marino worked at Sterling Sound. In 1998, Ted Jensen, Greg Calbi and Tom Coyne, along with Murat Aktar (Absolute Audio co-founder) and UK based Metropolis, purchased Sterling from previous owner, Lee Hulko. Marino was the most senior mastering engineer. Sterling Sound is located in New York City, occupying the top floor of the Chelsea Market in the Meatpacking District. Marino's studio is one of the three surround sound studios at Sterling and it was designed by Fran Manzella, FM Design.

Marino's room became one of the few mastering suites in the industry, if not the only one, that was capable of doing both surround sound and vinyl mastering. Marino, along with Chris Muth and Sterling techs Barry Wolifson and Phil Sztenderowicz, turned Marino's mastering console into an 8 channel A/B preview console. This design made possible presetting console parameters from song to song, which is needed for the continuous process of cutting a side of a vinyl album. This type of design was common in mastering houses during vinyl's heyday, but what made this one different was the ability to also process 6 discrete channels for surround sound.

Over the course of Marino's nearly 40 years with Sterling, he mastered and/or remastered albums by AC/DC, Cat Stevens, Led Zeppelin, Guns N' Roses, Metallica, DIO, Cheap Trick, Arcade Fire, Whitney Houston, Coldplay; Cyndi Lauper; Journey; Kiss; Mötley Crüe; The Cars; Bon Jovi; Arctic Monkeys; Dan Fogelberg; Iron Maiden; Fountains of Wayne; Incubus; Joe Bonamassa; Jimi Hendrix; Joe Satriani; Michael Bublé; Weezer; Leonard Cohen, My Morning Jacket, The Tragically Hip, 3 Doors Down, Alice Cooper, Billy Squier, Cinderella, M-Squad, Sarah Brightman, The Psychedelic Furs, Tommy James and the Shondells, Bob Dylan, John Mellencamp, Red Hot Chili Peppers, Ringo Starr, Santana, Josh Groban, Southside Johnny, Willie Nile, Elvis Presley, Fall Out Boy, Ozzy Osbourne, Blondie, Hanson, Jimmy Page and hundreds of others.

Marino mastered many of John Lennon's and Yoko Ono's albums, one of them being Double Fantasy with producer Jack Douglas. Double Fantasy had been out a few weeks when Douglas and Lennon decided to have a song they had just finished, Yoko Ono's "Walking on Thin Ice", mastered with Marino at Sterling Sound for a single release. On the evening of December 8, 1980, after finishing up a session at the Record Plant, Douglas said to Lennon "See you in the morning" as they planned to have breakfast together at 9am before heading to Sterling, but John Lennon was gunned down 20 minutes later on his way back to the Dakota.

Marino received his first and only Grammy for Arcade Fire's The Suburbs, the year before he died. In 2002, mastering engineers became eligible to win Grammys. From 1969 to 2012, Marino mastered albums which under current rules, would have won him an additional seven Grammys in the categories of Record of the Year, Album of the Year and Best Engineered Album, Non-Classical: three for Album of the Year winners Innervisions, Double Fantasy and The Bodyguard, two Record of the Year Grammys for "I Will Always Love You" and "Clocks", and two more for Best Engineered Album, Non-Classical for his mastering of Innervisions and Chicago 17.

Death 
Marino died on June 4, 2012, after a year battling with lung cancer. He was 65.

Awards and recognition
Grammy Awards
In 2002, Marino earned his first Grammy nomination for Bob Dylan's Love and Theft
In 2011, Marino won a Grammy Award for Album of the Year for Arcade Fire's The Suburbs

Nominations for a Mix Foundation TEC Award for Outstanding Creative Achievement
 1985
 1991
 1992
 1993

Selected works

Marino mastered and remastered thousands of albums in over 40 years as a mastering engineer.

References

External links

1947 births
2012 deaths
American audio engineers
Mastering engineers
People from the Bronx
Deaths from cancer in the United States
Deaths from lung cancer
American people of Italian descent